is a 1971 anime film by Toei Animation, retelling the evergreen story of Ali Baba and the Forty Thieves from the Arabian Nights, or One Thousand and One Nights.

It was directed by Hiroshi Shidara and written by Morihisa Yamamoto. Hayao Miyazaki played a decisive role in developing structure, characters and designs for this film, whose credits list him as Key Animator and Organizer. Seiichiro Uno wrote original music for the film.

It was released on 18 July 1971 in Japan. Other releases followed, including:
 West Germany (as Ali Cats und der fliegende Professor, on 16 March 1973)
 Italy (as Ali Babà e i 40 ladroni)
 USA (a dubbed version called Alibaba's Revenge)
 International English version (Ali Baba and the Forty Thieves)

Plot 
The story is about a little boy who is the descendant of the leader of the thieves who met their fate in the 1001 Nights. He joins forces with a mouse and 38 cats to form the 40 thieves whose sole purpose is to steal back their rightful treasure from Ali Baba the 33rd. The tyrannical Ali Baba being nearly broke as he has spent most of the money his father left him, finds a magic lamp which is inhabited by an ailurophobic genie who cannot work his magic unless all the cats in the kingdom are gone. The boy and his companions, plan to save the jailed cats, to get back the stolen treasures from Ali Baba and saving the oppressed people from his tyranny.

References

External links
 

1971 anime films
Films based on Ali Baba
1970s Japanese-language films
Japanese animated fantasy films
Japanese fantasy adventure films
Toei Animation films
1970s fantasy adventure films
Anime and manga based on fairy tales